The following is the list of cities in Uzbekistan that have undergone a name change in the past.

Karmine → Navoiy (1958)
Rishdan → Kuybishevo → Rishtan (1977)
Leninsk → Asaka (1938)
Maracanda → Samarqand
Novy Margelan → Skobelev (1910) → Farg'ona (1924)
Qarabagish → Sovetobod (1972) → Xonobod

See also
List of renamed cities in Kazakhstan
List of renamed cities in Kyrgyzstan
List of renamed cities in Tajikistan
List of renamed cities in Turkmenistan

Uzbekistan geography-related lists
 
Renamed, Uzbekistan
Uzbekistan, Renamed
Uzbekistan